The Troms Fotballkrets (Troms Football Association) is one of the 18 district organisations of the Norwegian Football Federation. It administers lower tier football in the traditional district of Troms.

Background 
Troms Fotballkrets, is the governing body for football in the traditional district of Troms, which today is a part of the county Troms og Finnmark. The Association currently has 77 member clubs. Based in Tromsø, the Association's chairman is Ronald Martinsen.

Affiliated members 
The following clubs are affiliated to the Troms Fotballkrets:

Bakkeby IK
Bardu IL
Bardufoss og Omegn IF
Berserk FK (futsal)
IL Blåmann
Botnhamn UIL
Brøstadbotn IL
Burfjord IL
Finnsnes IL
Fjordgård IL
IF Fløya
FK Foot 04
IL Foss
IL Framsyn
Furuflaten IL
Gibostad IF
Gluntan FK
Gryllefjord IL
Hamna IL
Havørn/Senjahopen IL
Husøy IL
Indre Kåfjord IL
Ishavsbyen FK
Kattfjord SK
Krokelvdalen IL
Kvaløya SK
Kvæsma FK
Laksvatn IL
Lavangen IF
Lyngen/Karnes IL
Lyngstuva SK
Manndalen UIL
Målselv IL
Mårfjell IL
Mellembygd IL
Nordkjosbotn IL
Nordpolen FK (futsal)
Nordreisa IL
Oksfjord og Straumfjord IL
Olderdalen IK
Øverbygd IL
Øvre Salangen IL
IL Pioner Fotball
Ramfjord UIL
Reinen IL
Ringvassøy IL
Rotsundelv IL
Røyken UIL
Salangen IF
FK Senja
Sjarmtrollan IL
IF Skarp
Skarven IL
Skibotn IL
Skjervøy IK
Skøelv IGL
Skognes og Omegn IL
Søndre Torsken IL
Sør-Kvaløya IL
Sørreisa IL
Sør-Tranøy IL
Stakkevollan IF
Storelva AIL
Storfjord IL
Storsteinnes IL
Svalbard TIL
Tranøy BK
Tromsdalen UIL
Tromsø IL
Tromsøstudentenes IL
FK Tromsøysund
IL Ulfstind
Ullsfjord SK
Unglyn IL
Vallhall FK
Varden FK
Vårsol IL

League competitions 
Troms Fotballkrets run the following league competitions:

Men's football
4. divisjon  -  one section
5. divisjon  -  one section
6. divisjon  -  three sections

Women's football
2. divisjon  -  two sections (section 8 with Hålogaland Fotballkrets and section 9 with Finnmark Fotballkrets) 
3. divisjon  -  one section

Footnotes

External links 

Troms
Sport in Troms